In graph theory, perfect matching in high-degree hypergraphs is a research avenue trying to find sufficient conditions for existence of a perfect matching in a hypergraph, based only on the degree of vertices or subsets of them.

Introduction

Degrees and matchings in graphs 

A matching in a graph is a set of edges such that each vertex is adjacent to at most one edge; a perfect matching is a matching in which each vertex is adjacent to exactly one edge. A perfect matching does not always exist, and thus it is interesting to find sufficient conditions that guarantee its existence.

One such condition follows from Dirac's theorem on Hamiltonian cycles. It says that, if , then the graph admits a Hamiltonian cycle; this implies that it admits a perfect matching. The factor  is tight, since the complete bipartite graph on  vertices has degree  but does not admit a perfect matching.

The results described below aim to extend these results from graphs to hypergraphs.

Degrees in hypergraphs 
Thus, the degree of a hypergraph can be defined in different ways depending on the size of subsets whose degree is considered.

Thus,  corresponds to the  definition of a degree of a simple graph, namely the smallest degree of a single vertex;  is the smallest degree of a pair of vertices; etc.

In a simple graph, .

Conditions on 1-vertex degree 
Several authors proved sufficient conditions for the case , i.e., conditions on the smallest degree of a single vertex. 

 If  is a 3-uniform hypergraph on  vertices,  is a multiple of 3, and then  contains a perfect matching.
 If  is a 3-uniform hypergraph on  vertices,  is a multiple of 3, and then  contains a perfect matching - a matching of size . This result is the best possible.
 If  is a 4-uniform hypergraph with on  vertices,  is a multiple of 4, and  then  contains a perfect matching - a matching of size . This result is the best possible.
In particular, setting  gives that, if then  contains a perfect matching.
 If  is -uniform and -partite, each side contains exactly  vertices, and then  contains a matching of size at least . In particular, setting  gives that if  then  contains a perfect matching.

For comparison, Dirac's theorem on Hamiltonian cycles says that, if  is 2-uniform (i.e., a simple graph) and  

then  admits a perfect matching.

Conditions on (r-1)-tuple degree 
Several authors proved sufficient conditions for the case , i.e., conditions on the smallest degree of sets of  vertices, in -uniform hypergraphs with  vertices.

In r-partite r-uniform hypergraphs 
The following results relate to -partite hypergraphs that have exactly  vertices on each side ( vertices overall):

This expression is smallest possible up to the lower-order term; in particular,  is not sufficient.
The  factor is essentially the best possible.

In general r-uniform hypergraphs 
 For every , when  is large enough, if then  is Hamiltonian, and thus contains a perfect matching.
 If then  admits a matching that covers all but at most  vertices. 
 2 otherwise.

Other conditions 
There are some sufficient conditions for other values of :

 If  is -partite and each side contains exactly  vertices, and then  contains a matching covering all but  vertices.

See also 

 Hall-type theorems for hypergraphs - lists other sufficient conditions for the existence of perfect matchings in hypergraphs, analogous to Hall's marriage theorem.

References 

Hypergraphs
Matching (graph theory)